Darius Young (April 2, 1938 – June 23, 2021) was an American sport shooter. He competed in pistol shooting events at the Summer Olympics in 1988 and 1992.

Olympic results

References

1938 births
2021 deaths
People from Anaheim, California
ISSF pistol shooters
American male sport shooters
Shooters at the 1988 Summer Olympics
Shooters at the 1992 Summer Olympics
Olympic shooters of the United States
Pan American Games medalists in shooting
Pan American Games silver medalists for the United States
Shooters at the 1987 Pan American Games
Medalists at the 1987 Pan American Games
20th-century American people
21st-century American people